Frederick Vallette McNair Jr. (March 13, 1882 – September 2, 1962) was an officer of the United States Navy and a recipient of the Medal of Honor for his actions at the beginning of the U.S. occupation of Veracruz, Mexico.

McNair was a graduate of the United States Naval Academy (Class of 1903), the son of Rear Admiral Frederick V. McNair (Class of 1857), the grandfather of tennis star Frederick V. McNair, IV and poet-novelist Lailee McNair.

McNair rose to the rank of captain.

He is buried in the United States Naval Academy Cemetery and his grave can be located in lot 406.

Medal of Honor citation
McNair's Medal of Honor citation reads:

For distinguished conduct in battle engagement of Vera Cruz, 22 April 1914. Lt. McNair was eminent and conspicuous in command of his battalion. He exhibited courage and skill in leading his men through the action of the 22d and in the final occupation of the city.

See also
List of Medal of Honor recipients (Veracruz)

References
Hall of Valor

1882 births
1962 deaths
United States Navy Medal of Honor recipients
United States Navy officers
United States Naval Academy alumni
Burials at the United States Naval Academy Cemetery
Recipients of the Navy Cross (United States)
Battle of Veracruz (1914) recipients of the Medal of Honor